ANTILLAS I is a fiber optic submarine communications cable that extends between the Dominican Republic and Puerto Rico. It has been in service since June 1997 and is operated on a common carrier basis.

ANTILLAS I uses digital channels operating at 64 kilobits per second (kbit/s) that allow over 15,000 simultaneous calls without multiplexing. It consists of six working optical fiber pairs with each fiber pair carrying four 155  Mbit/s Basic System Modules (BSMs), with each BSM containing sixty-three Minimum Investment Units (MIUs), for a total capacity, on each fiber pair, of 252 MIUs.

Carriers
 AT&T Corporation (AT&T)
 GTE Hawaiian Telephone Company Incorporated (HTC)
 IDB WorldCom Services (WorldCom)
 International Telecommunications Corporation (ITC)
 MCI International
 Pacific Gateway Exchange (PGE)
 Sprint Nextel Corporation (Sprint)
 Telecomunicaciones Ultramarinas de Puerto Rico (TUPR or ULTRACOM)
 Telefónica International Wholesale Services (TIWS)
 The St. Thomas and San Juan Telephone Company (STSJ)

Landing points
 Cacique, Dominican Republic
 Isla Verde, Carolina, Puerto Rico
 Miramar, San Juan, Puerto Rico
 Punta Cana, Dominican Republic

External links
 
 AMERICAS-II Cable Landing License as adopted by the Federal Communications Commission

Liberty Latin America
Submarine communications cables in the Caribbean Sea
Communications in the Caribbean
Dominican Republic–United States relations
1997 establishments in the Dominican Republic
1997 establishments in Puerto Rico